Harvey Winson Fellows (11 April 1826 in Rickmansworth, Hertfordshire – 13 January 1907 in Rickmansworth) was an English amateur cricketer.  He was the brother of Walter Fellows.

Career
Fellows was a right-handed batsman and a roundarm right arm fast bowler.  Having made his name as a schoolboy cricketer at Eton College, where he bowled in tandem with Walter Marcon in 1841 and 1842, Fellows was mainly associated with Marylebone Cricket Club (MCC).  He played for several predominantly amateur teams, including I Zingari, and represented the Gentlemen in the Gentlemen v Players series.

Fellows was noted for his fearsome pace, especially on rough pitches.  He is said to have reached his peak early and, after he changed his action by raising the height of his arm during delivery, he lost much of his speed and accuracy.

Fellows made 67 known appearances in first-class matches from 1847 to 1869.  His known career bowling record includes a total of 169 wickets at an average of 7.66 with a best performance of 8 wickets in one innings. He is credited with ten wickets in a match on 7 occasions.

References

External links
 CricketArchive record

Sources
 
 
 

1826 births
1907 deaths
English cricketers
English cricketers of 1826 to 1863
English cricketers of 1864 to 1889
Gentlemen cricketers
Marylebone Cricket Club cricketers
People from Rickmansworth
I Zingari cricketers
Gentlemen of the South cricketers
Gentlemen of England cricketers
Gentlemen of Marylebone Cricket Club cricketers
Non-international England cricketers